Marvic Mario Victor Famorca Leonen (born December 29, 1962) is the Senior associate justice of the Supreme Court of the Philippines since May 14, 2022 upon the retirement of Senior Associate Justice Estela Perlas-Bernabe. He became an associate justice of the Supreme Court of the Philippines on November 21, 2012 – the second youngest to hold the said position since Manuel V. Moran in 1938. Prior to his stint in the country's highest court, he served as chief peace negotiator of the Republic of the Philippines in peace talks with the Moro Islamic Liberation Front.

Leonen was dean of the University of the Philippines College of Law at Diliman from 2008 to 2011. He is well known in the fields of environmental activism and community organizing.

Early life
Marvic Leonen was born on December 29, 1962, to lawyer Mauro Leonen and Adrelina Famorca.

Education and early career
After finishing high school at Saint Louis University-Boys' High School as valedictorian, Leonen graduated magna cum laude with a degree in economics from the University of the Philippines Diliman in 1983 and served as chairperson of the organization Economics Toward Consciousness, a student organization based in the University of the Philippines School of Economics, in A.Y. 1982–1983. He obtained his law degree from the university's College of Law in 1987. From his senior year, Leonen joined the Free Legal Assistance Group or FLAG and won his first case defending rebels captured without a search warrant. Later that year, he co-founded the Legal Rights and Natural Resources Center, Inc.-Kasama sa Kalikasan, a legal and policy research and advocacy institution that provides legal services to upland rural poor and indigenous people's communities. He served as the Center's executive director for 15 years. He then left for Columbia University for his Master of Laws degree.

Academic career

Leonen joined the law faculty in 1989 as professorial lecturer in Philippine Indigenous Law. He became assistant professor during the term of Dean Pacifico Agabin and started to do work as an academic administrator under the term of Dean Merlin M. Magallona. In 2000, he joined the University of the Philippines System administration as university general counsel. In March 2005, he became the first vice president for legal affairs of the UP System. Leonen has taught 20 different subjects in the law school. He also served as director of the clinical legal education program of the college. His teaching competence is not only acknowledged in the CL but also in other institutions, such as Miriam College and the Philippine Judicial Academy. He has extensively lectured and acted as resource speaker in national and international fora such as those conducted in Hong Kong, Thailand, Malaysia, Indonesia, Japan, Spain, Netherlands, Australia, Estonia, and the United Kingdom.

In 2008, he was selected as the Dean of the University of the Philippines College of Law at UP Diliman by the Board of Regents of the UP System. He served as Dean until the appointment of Danilo L. Concepcion in June 2011.

Leonen has also provided legal commentary for television networks such as ABS-CBN and GMA Network during the coverage of such events as the 2000-2001 impeachment trial of President Joseph Estrada.

Government chief peace negotiator (2010–2012)
In July 2010, Leonen was named by President Benigno Aquino III as the Philippine government's chief negotiator with the Moro Islamic Liberation Front. Under his leadership, the government successfully sealed a framework agreement with the MILF for the establishment of the Bangsamoro political entity to replace the Autonomous Region for Muslim Mindanao. His performance was hailed by different sectors in society, bringing new hopes for lasting peace in war-torn Mindanao.

Service on the Supreme Court of the Philippines
On 21 November 2012, President Benigno Aquino III named Leonen as the 172nd Associate Justice of the Supreme Court of the Philippines at the age of 49. Leonen is the youngest justice named to the Court since 1938.

In oral arguments, Leonen frequently challenges the arguer's position with his stringent lines of questioning. He frequently uses the Socratic method in order to test positions and arguments of counsel appearing in Court.

In the landmark case Belgica v. Executive Secretary, where the Court declared the Priority Development Assistance Fund unconstitutional, Leonen wrote a separate concurring opinion where he displayed great command of logic and the law in order to arrive with conclusions regarding the unconstitutionality of pork barrel. He said, "A member of the House of Representatives or a Senator is not an automated teller machine from which the public can withdraw funds for sundry private purposes."

Dissents

Leonen is known for his frequent dissents in the Court. In an interview with Rappler, he said that while his point of view might often be "before its time," it does not frustrate him to dissent, as in the future, the reasoning in his dissent might be relied upon by the majority, pointing to the case of Holmes' dissent in Abrams v. United States as an example where this had happened.

Among Leonen's notable work is his powerful dissent in Disini v. Secretary of Justice, where he argued that the entire concept of criminal libel, and cyberlibel, is an unconstitutional vestige of American and Spanish colonialism. He's also noted for his dissent in Republic v. Sereno, calling the majority's decision a "legal abomination."

References

1962 births
Living people
Associate Justices of the Supreme Court of the Philippines
People from Baguio
Columbia Law School alumni
20th-century Filipino lawyers
21st-century Filipino judges
Filipino environmentalists
University of the Philippines Diliman alumni
Academic staff of the University of the Philippines
Benigno Aquino III administration personnel